William Lord may refer to:
William Lord (Medal of Honor) (1841–1915), American army musician and Medal of Honor recipient
William Barry Lord (19th century), British army veterinary surgeon and writer
William Paine Lord (1838–1911), American politician from Oregon
William T. Lord (born c. 1955), American air force officer
William A. Lord (1849–1927), Vermont lawyer and politician
William Lord (cricketer) (1873–1906), English cricketer